The 2021–22 Seattle Redhawks women's basketball team represents Seattle University during the 2021–22 NCAA Division I women's basketball season. The Redhawks, led by sixth year head coach Suzy Barcomb, play their home games at the Redhawk Center and are members of the Western Athletic Conference.

Roster

Schedule

|-
!colspan=9 style=| Exhibition

|-
!colspan=9 style=| Non-conference schedule

|-
!colspan=9 style=| WAC conference schedule

|-
!colspan=9 style=|WAC Tournament

See also
2021–22 Seattle Redhawks men's basketball team

References

Seattle Redhawks women's basketball seasons
Seattle
Seattle Redhawks
Seattle Redhawks